The Austria national handball team is the national handball team of Austria.

Competitive record

Olympic Games

World Championship

European Championship

* Colored background indicates that medal was won on the tournament.
** Red border color indicates that tournament was held on home soil.

Team

Current squad
Squad for the 2021 World Men's Handball Championship.

Head coach: Aleš Pajovič

Player statistics

Most capped players
Players with at least 150 games are:

Top scorers
Players with at least 300 goals are:

References

External links

IHF profile

Men's national handball teams
Handball in Austria